Kai Luke Brümmer (also stylised as Brummer; born 17 February 1993) is a South African actor. He is known for his role as Nicholas van der Swart in the film Moffie (2019). The Guardian named him one of the best new-and-up-comers at the 76th Venice Film Festival.

Early life
Brümmer was born in Johannesburg to parents Jacques and Natalie and grew up in Henley on Klip. He was introduced to acting by his mother, who was a drama teacher. He attended St John's College, Johannesburg. He went on to graduate in 2016 with a Bachelor of Arts in Theatre & Performance with a distinction in Acting from the University of Cape Town. He was briefly a ringmaster for the Boswell Wilkie Circus.

Filmography

Film

Television

Stage

Awards and nominations

References

External links
 
 Kai Luke Brümmer at Independent Talent
 Kai Luke Brümmer at Stella Talent

Living people
1993 births
21st-century South African male actors
Alumni of St John's College (Johannesburg)
Male actors from Johannesburg
People from Midvaal Local Municipality
South African male film actors
South African male stage actors
University of Cape Town alumni